Anaticola is a genus of lice belonging to the family Philopteridae, which was first described in 1935 by Theresa Clay.

The species of this genus are found in Europe and New Zealand.

Species:

Anaticola angustolimbatus 
Anaticola anseris 
Anaticola asymmetricus 
Anaticola australis 
Anaticola beieri 
Anaticola branderi 
Anaticola breviceps 
Anaticola buccinator 
Anaticola cairinensis 
Anaticola candidus 
Anaticola chaetodens 
Anaticola clangulae 
Anaticola coloratus 
Anaticola constrictus 
Anaticola crassicornis 
Anaticola cygnopsis 
Anaticola delacouri 
Anaticola dissonus 
Anaticola ernstmayri 
Anaticola gambensis 
Anaticola jamesi 
Anaticola klockenhoffi 
Anaticola magnificus 
Anaticola marginella 
Anaticola megaceros 
Anaticola mergiserrati 
Anaticola parviceps 
Anaticola phoenicopteri 
Anaticola pseudofuligulae 
Anaticola rheinwaldi 
Anaticola tadornae 
Anaticola tamarae 
Anaticola thoracicus 
Anaticola tordae

References

Lice